Plastic is the generic name for a family of synthetic materials derived from petrochemicals. It is often product of two or more components. 
 
There are many families of plastics and polymers being used in construction industry. Examples of plastics used in building are:

Acrylic
Composites
Expanded Polystyrene
Polycarbonate
Polyethylene
Polypropylene
Polyvinyl Chloride

in building materials. Some of these properties are:

Merits
Plastics are strong yet lightweight, and so they are easy to transport & manoeuvre.
They are durable, knock-and scratch resistant with excellent weatherability.
They do not rot or corrode.
Plastics are easy to install; many have a snap-fit kind of jointing procedures.
Plastics offer limitless possibilities in design achieved by extrusion, bending, moulding etc.
They can be given any range of colours by adding pigments.
The plastics are low conductors of heat and thus are used as insulation materials in green building concepts.
The plastics products can achieve tight seals.
Plastic doesn't break easily
They can be sawn and nailed employing standard carpentry tools and skills.
They can be easily removed and recycled.
They are poor conductors of electricity.

Disadvantages and limitations

Plastics may be degraded under the action of direct sunlight which reduces their mechanical strength.
Many plastics are flammable unless treated.
High embodied energy content
Low modulus of elasticity: makes them unsuitable for load-bearing applications.
Thermoplastics are subject to creep and soften at moderate temperatures.
Thermal expansion for most plastics is high: adequate thermal movement has to be allowed in detailing.
Many types of plastics are not biodegradable thus cause pollution when they accumulate.

Products
Some of the examples below are Products of Plastics in the Construction industry:

 Pipes  : Electrical  Conduits, Rain Water & Sewage pipes, Plumbing, Gas Distributions.
 Cables :  PVC Insulation on cables, Insulation Tapes .
 Floorings :  Flooring tiles  & Rolls .
 Domes / sky lights :  Opaque as well as transparent.
 Roofing  : Coloured or Double skinned for insulation.
 Windows & doors : Extruded sections for Door and  windows and panels.
 Storage tanks :  Storage tanks. 
 Hardware accessories :  Washers, Nut bolts, Sleeves, Anchoring wires.
 Temporary structures: Guard cabins, tents 
 Insulation materials: PVC sheets, insulating membranes.

References

Plastics